Searchlight Capital Partners is a private equity firm. 

Searchlight Capital was established in 2010 by Eric Zinterhofer, Oliver Haarmann, and Erol Uzumeri, its founding partners. It has offices in New York,  Conduit Street, London and Toronto.

In January  2012, Searchlight Capital completed the acquisition of the famed rubber Wellington Boot manufacturer Hunter Boot Ltd.

In July 2014, Searchlight Capital acquired the Canadian meat and frozen food retail chain M&M Food Market.   

In June 2015, Searchlight Capital (40%) and Liberty Global (60%) jointly acquired Choice Cable TV, Puerto Rico's second largest cable operator, for US$272.5 million.

In October 2015, Searchlight Capital acquired a majority stake in the Canadian apparel brand Roots Canada, with a minority stake still held by its founders.

In December 2015, Searchlight Capital closed its second fund with $1.94 billion of commitments.

In April 2018, Searchlight Capital acquired Canadian enterprise telecommunications company Mitel in an all-cash transaction of $2 billion.

In July 2021, Searchlight Capital acquired the Fixed Wireless Internet Service Provider All Points Broadband.

References

External links

Private equity firms of the United Kingdom
Financial services companies based in London
Financial services companies established in 2010
2010 establishments in England